Przygodzki may refer to:

People with the surname
Ryszard Przygodzki (born 1957), Polish footballer
 Paweł Przygodzki, Secretary general of the Order of Saint Paul the First Hermit

See also
Janków Przygodzki, village in Poland